The Academy is a Hong Kong TVB modern drama focusing on two young men (played by Ron Ng and Sammul Chan) from entering and training at the police academy to joining the police force and solving crime.

The original series 
 2005: TV series The Academy
 2007: TV series On the First Beat
 2009: TV series E.U

Spin-offs 
 2009: Film Turning Point
 2011: TV series Lives of Omission
 2011: Film Turning Point 2

Cast

Viewership ratings

TVB dramas
Hong Kong action television series
Hong Kong police procedural television series